Ilya Musin (born February 3, 1991) is a Russian professional ice hockey player. He is currently playing with Metallurg Novokuznetsk of the Kontinental Hockey League (KHL)

Musin made his Kontinental Hockey League debut playing with Metallurg Novokuznetsk during the 2010–11 KHL season.

References

External links

1991 births
Living people
Kuznetskie Medvedi players
Metallurg Novokuznetsk players
Russian ice hockey forwards
People from Novokuznetsk
Sportspeople from Kemerovo Oblast